Richard Kline (born April 29, 1944) is an American actor and television director. His roles include Larry Dallas on the sitcom Three's Company, Richie in the later seasons of It's a Living and Jeff Beznick in Noah Knows Best.

Early life
Kline was born in New York City. He was raised in Queens by parents who practiced Reform Judaism. He attended Queens College and has a Master of Fine Arts degree in theater from Northwestern University. After graduation, he joined the United States Army and served in Vietnam during the Vietnam War as a lieutenant.

Career
Kline became involved in theater and made his professional debut in 1971 as part of the Lincoln Center Repertory Company. Regional theater productions during this period included Chemin de Fer (in Chicago with actor Dennis Franz), Death of a Salesman, and Love's Labour's Lost. A classically trained singer, Kline made his Broadway career debut in the 1989 musical City of Angels.

On Three's Company, Kline played Larry Dallas, a playboy neighbor, used car salesman, and best friend to John Ritter's Jack Tripper. Kline appeared in 110 episodes of Three's Company from 1977 to 1984, also appearing as Larry Dallas in the spin-off shows The Ropers (1979) and Three's a Crowd (1985). Larry has the distinction of being the only other character besides Jack Tripper to appear on Three's Company and both of its spin-offs.

In addition to his television and big screen appearances, Kline has hosted two game show pilots, Jumble in 1988 and To Tell the Truth in 1990. The show's rights were then sold to NBC with Gordon Elliott, then Lynn Swann and Alex Trebek later hosting. Kline's TTTT pilot did air on the East Coast as a mistake on September 3, 1990, the day the show debuted. He also subbed for Charles Nelson Reilly as a guest panelist on Sweethearts for a week of shows in December 1988. His game show celebrity appearances included both The $25,000 Pyramid and The $100,000 Pyramid, Super Password, and multiple appearances on the Match Game-Hollywood Squares Hour. Kline told SitcomsOnline.com he would like to compete on Jeopardy!, joking, "but I'm afraid I would take all their money!"

In February 2010, he was cast as the Wizard in the first national tour of Wicked.

Kline was seen next in October 2011 in It Shoulda Been You, directed by David Hyde Pierce and starring Tyne Daly. In 2016, Kline appeared in a movie directed by and starring Mike Birbiglia called Don't Think Twice.

Kline reunited with Three's Company cast members Joyce DeWitt, Jenilee Harrison and Priscilla Barnes in September 2016 at "The Hollywood Show" in suburban Chicago, an autograph and memorabilia event, meeting fans and signing autographs.

Kline played Kid Twist in the Paper Mill Playhouse world premiere production of The Sting starring Harry Connick Jr. which ran April 8–29, 2018. In December 2018, he joined the national tour of the musical Waitress through August 2019.  He reprised the role in the Broadway cast from August 20, 2019, until the show closed on January 5, 2020.

Selected filmography

 The Mary Tyler Moore Show (TV) (1976) - Prosecutor
 Eight Is Enough (TV) (1977) - Mr. Corelli
 Maude (TV) (3 episodes, 1977–78) - Tuggy McKenna
 Three's Company (TV) (110 episodes, 1977–84) - Larry Dallas
 The Ropers (TV) (1979) - Larry Dallas
 Whew! (TV) (1979, 1980) - Himself
 The Love Boat (TV) (1981)
 Peter-No-Tail (1981) - Additional Voices (English version)
 Three's a Crowd (TV) (1985) - Larry Dallas
 Hotel (TV) (1985) - Gerald Phelps
 It's a Living (TV) (9 episodes, 1985–88) - Richie Gray
 Murder, She Wrote (TV) (1986) - Larry Kinkaid
 Hill Street Blues (TV) (1987) - Arnold Resnick
 St. Elsewhere (TV) (1987) - Michael
 Hunter (TV) (1987) - Michael Edleton 
 Matlock (TV) (1988) - The Umpire
 Problem Child (1990) - Additional Voice (voice)
 Father Dowling Mysteries (TV)  (1991) - Harold Berman
 NYPD Blue (TV) (1993)
 L.A. Law (TV) (1994) - Mr. Pembrook
 Family Matters (TV) (1995) - Mr. Fleming
 Step by Step (TV) (1995) - Mr. Sloan
 The Bold and the Beautiful (TV) (1995–96) - Dr. Mark Benson
 Married... with Children (TV) (1996) - Flint Guccione
 Beverly Hills Ninja (1997) - Driver
 The Nanny (TV) (1997) - Guest Appearance in Episode 04/24
 Treehouse Hostage (1999) - Principal Ott
 Liberty Heights (1999) - Charlie, Nate's Assistant
 That '70s Show (TV) (1999) - Ted
 Warm Blooded Killers (1999) - Ush
 Noah Knows Best (TV) (13 episodes, 2000) - Jeff Beznick
 Saving Silverman (2001) - Acrobat Announcer (voice, uncredited)
 Judging Amy (TV) (2001) - Daryl Hoeller
 Inside Schwartz (TV) (2002) - Gene Schwartz
 Gilmore Girls (TV) (2002) - Miles Hahn
 Jane White Is Sick & Twisted (2002) - Anchor Chris Jobin
 ER (TV) (2004) - Risk Assessment Expert
 NYPD Blue (TV) (2004) - Barry Driscoll
 Karroll's Christmas (2004) - Bradley Carchet
 To Kill a Mockumentary (TV) (2006)
 Knight to F4 (2005) - Truman Fetcher
 I Now Pronounce You Chuck & Larry (2007) - Mr. Auerbach
 Jack and Jill (2011) - Theatergoer #1
 The Americans (2013-2016 FX series) three episodes - Bill Hanson
 Don't Think Twice (2016) - Mr. Coughlin
 Blue Bloods (TV) (2020) - Judge
 The Resident (TV) (2021) - George Criforth
 Around the Sun'' (2022-23) - MJ / Daniel

References

External links
 
 
 

1944 births
Living people
Male actors from New York City
American male film actors
United States Army personnel of the Vietnam War
American male television actors
20th-century American male actors
American television directors
Northwestern University School of Communication alumni
Jewish American male actors
Queens College, City University of New York alumni
21st-century American male actors
People from Queens, New York
United States Army officers
Jewish American military personnel
21st-century American Jews